Sau Din Saas Keis a 27 June 1980 Indian Bollywood film directed by Vijay Sadanah and produced by Chander Sadanah. It stars Reena Roy, Ashok Kumar, Raj Babbar , Asha Parekh, Siddharth Kak and Bela Bose in pivotal roles. Lalita Pawar acted as a wicked mother in law, as she was famous for. Reena Roy is the star of the show. She plays an unconventional daughter-in-law who questions society's norms of suppressing daughters-in-law. Reena Roy looks fierce and delivers an outstanding performance as Durga. 

It is a remake of the Marathi film Sasurvashin (1978), produced by Annasaheb Deulgaonkar, directed by Babasaheb S. Fattelal, and starring Lalita Pawar and Nilu Phule in the supporting roles. The film was also remade in Tamil as Marumagale Vazhga (1986) starring Suhasini.

Plot summary
It is a story about a mother in law (Lalita Pawar) who tortures her elder daughter in law(Asha Parekh) in order to prove her control over the family. Her Younger Son( Raj Babbar) fell in love with (Reena Roy)  and want to marry her. After marriage he refuse to take his wife at his mother's place due to her mother's sarcastic nature but Reena Roy is adamant and visits her mother in law's place in order to prove her that daughter in law's are not mere slaves. After many circumstances at last Lalita Pawar realised the truth and gave her affection to both of her daughter in laws.

Cast
 Nilu Phule...Lalla Khubchand (Lallaji)
 Ashok Kumar...Colonel Gupta
 Reena Roy...Durga
 Raj Babbar...Prakash
 Bela Bose...Soumitra (Gupta's wife)
 Asha Parekh...Sheela
 Lalita Pawar...Bhawani Devi (Prakash's mother)
 Deven Verma...Totaram
 Jayshree T.Kesarbai
 Manmohan Krishna...Sukhlal Kaka
 Siddharth Kak... Sheela's husband

Music
"Saathi Mere Tum Jo Mile Sara Jahan Mere Sath Aa Gya" - Suresh Wadkar, Kanchan
"Sau Sau Saal Jiyo Hamari Saasu Ji" - Kanchan, Asha Bhosle
"Maha Chalu Hai Dilbar Mera" - Asha Bhosle
"Moti Palley Pai Gayi" - Mahendra Kapoor

External links

1980s Hindi-language films
1980 films
Hindi remakes of Marathi films
Films scored by Kalyanji Anandji